Chit Su Moe (born 4 December 1994) is a Burmese professional footballer who plays as a defensive midfielder for Chin United in the Myanmar National League.

External links 
 

1994 births
Living people
Burmese footballers
Myanmar international footballers
Association football midfielders
Southeast Asian Games silver medalists for Myanmar
Southeast Asian Games medalists in football
Competitors at the 2015 Southeast Asian Games